There have been two baronetcies created for members of the Ropner family, both in the Baronetage of the United Kingdom. Both creations are still extant. The Ropner family is of German descent.

The Ropner Baronetcy, of Preston Hall, in the parish of Stockton-on-Tees, in the County Palatine of Durham, and of Skutterskelfe Hall, in the parish of Hutton Rudby, in the North Riding of the County of York, was created in the Baronetage of the United Kingdom on 20 August 1904 for Robert Ropner. He was a steamship owner and steamship builder and also represented Stockton-on-Tees in the House of Commons as a Conservative.

The Ropner Baronetcy, of Thorp Perrow in the North Riding of the County of York, was created in the Baronetage of the United Kingdom on 31 January 1952 for Leonard Ropner, for many years Conservative Member of Parliament for Sedgefield and Barkston Ash. He was the son of William Ropner, third son of the first Baronet of the 1904 creation. Consequently, the present holder of the baronetcy is also in remainder to the Ropner Baronetcy of 1904.

Ropner baronets, of Preston Hall and Skutterskelfe Hall (1904)
Sir (Emil Hugo Oscar) Robert Ropner, 1st Baronet (1838–1924)
Sir John Henry Ropner, 2nd Baronet (1860–1936) 
Sir Emil Hugo Oscar Robert Ropner, 3rd Baronet (1893–1962) 
Sir Robert Douglas Ropner, 4th Baronet (1921–2004) 
Sir Robert Clinton Ropner, 5th Baronet (born 1949)

Ropner baronets, of Thorp Perrow (1952)
Sir Leonard Ropner, 1st Baronet (1895–1977) 
Sir John Bruce Woollacott Ropner, 2nd Baronet (1937–2016)  
Sir Henry John William Ropner, 3rd Baronet (born 1981)

References

Kidd, Charles, Williamson, David (editors). Debrett's Peerage and Baronetage (1990 edition). New York: St Martin's Press, 1990.

Baronetcies in the Baronetage of the United Kingdom